Heinrich Diepold Georg Freiherr von Lüttwitz (6 December 1896 – 9 October 1969) was a Prussian Junker, Olympic equestrian, and German officer who served in both World Wars, retiring as a General der Panzertruppe. Lüttwitz's team competed at the 1936 Summer games in Berlin but they came away without a medal. This failure was viewed as a disgrace by the Nazi regime and, as a consequence, he was left in professional obscurity for the next few years. He eventually went on to command two Panzer Divisions and the XLVII. Panzerkorps (47th Panzer Corps), where he earned infamy for his demand of the surrender of the American 101st Airborne Division.

Early and Interwar years   
Lüttwitz excelled in school and, like many Prussian aristocrats, took up riding at an early age, becoming an accomplished equestrian. He was pursuing professional equestrianism when the First World War broke out. Despite the family tracing their military ancestry back to the 14th century and his father being a former Army officer, Lüttwitz was unable to get his father's permission to seek a military commission. In defiance, he enlisted as a Private in the Army in August 1914, at the age of seventeen. His mother, from the prominent von Unruh(de) Junker military family, used her influence to have him brevetted to Leutnant in December.

After graduating from officer training, he was posted to the 48th (5th Brandenburg) Infantry Regiment, of the 5th Division. Thereafter began a tug of war between himself and his father, an influential veteran of the Franco-Prussian War. The elder Lüttwitz likely used his influence to have his son posted to the rear area of the unit, away from the front lines. The younger Lüttwitz then began a letter-writing campaign to his superiors, appealing for a transfer to the front. This was granted in 1917 when he was given command of an infantry platoon. He won the Iron Cross Second and First Class before being wounded and sent back to Germany to convalesce. After recovering in May 1918, his family again used their connections and influence, this time to have him posted to the 1st Ulan Schützen Regiment, a crack unit of dismounted cavalry, trained in exploiting breakthroughs in enemy lines created by Sturmtruppen. This tactic, successful early in 1918, was no longer viable by the time Lüttwitz arrived at the unit and so he spent most of the remainder of the war on maneuvers. After the Armistice, he returned with his regiment to Silesia. Unlike most units in the rapidly disbanding Army, his regiment was retained in the new Reichswehr as the 8th Cavalry Regiment of the 2nd Cavalry Division, enabling Lüttwitz to remain in active military service.

World War II 

He was kept from the frontlines of the Invasion of Poland until the outcome was already decided and then, three days later, was badly wounded by a Polish sniper. 

In 1944 during the Battle of the Bulge, Lüttwitz's XLVII Panzer Corps had surrounded the US 101st Airborne Division at Bastogne. US forces were commanded by Brigadier General Anthony McAuliffe. 

Before launching an assault by the 26th Volksgrenadier Division against the town, Lüttwitz sent an ultimatum to the American forces. His demand for US troops to surrender was as follows:

To the U.S.A. Commander of the encircled town of Bastogne. There is only one possibility to save the encircled U.S.A. troops from total annihilation: that is the honorable surrender of the encircled town. In order to think it over a term of two hours will be granted beginning with the presentation of this note. If this proposal should be rejected one German Artillery Corps and six heavy A. A. Battalions are ready to annihilate the U.S.A. troops in and near Bastogne. The order for firing will be given immediately after this two hours term. All the serious civilian losses caused by this artillery fire would not correspond with the well-known American humanity.

He received the following reply from McAuliffe: "To the German Commander.  NUTS!" The reply, "Nuts!", was explained to the German negotiators as the equivalent of "go to hell!"

Awards
 Iron Cross (1914) 2nd Class (18 May 1915) & 1st Class (2 June 1918)
 Wound Badge (1918) in Black
 German Cross in Gold on 19 December 1941 as Oberstleutnant in the Schützen-Regiment 59
 Clasp to the Iron Cross (1939) 2nd Class (20 September 1939) & 1st Class (1 August 1941)
 Knight's Cross of the Iron Cross with Oak Leaves and Swords
 Knight's Cross on 27 May 1942 as Oberst and commander of Schützen-Regiment 59
 571st Oak Leaves on 3 September 1944 as Generalleutnant and commander of the 2. Panzer-Division
 Nominated for Swords in 1945 as General der Panzertruppe and commanding general of the XXXXVII. Panzerkorps

Notes

References

Citations

Bibliography

Further reading

  R. V. Cassill (1955), The General Said "Nuts":  Exciting Moments of Our History—As Recalled by Our Favorite American Slogans, New York:  Birk.

1896 births
1969 deaths
People from Trzebnica County
People from the Province of Silesia
Prussian nobility
Barons of Germany
German Army personnel of World War I
Prussian Army personnel
Generals of Panzer Troops
Recipients of the Gold German Cross
Recipients of the clasp to the Iron Cross, 1st class
Recipients of the Knight's Cross of the Iron Cross with Oak Leaves and Swords
Reichswehr personnel
20th-century Freikorps personnel
German Army generals of World War II